The 2009 FIBA Stanković Continental Champions' Cup, or 2009 FIBA Mini World Cup, was the fifth edition of the FIBA Stanković Continental Champions' Cup tournament. It was held in Kunshan, China, from August 28 to August 31.

Participating teams

Results
All 4 teams played a round-robin tournament first. The top 2 teams advanced to final while the other 2 teams fought for 3rd place.

Round-robin

All time UTC+8.

Third-place Playoff

Final

Final standings

External links
Official Website

2009
2009–10 in Chinese basketball
2009–10 in Angolan basketball
2009–10 in Turkish basketball
2009–10 in Australian basketball